Mario and the Magician is a novella written by German author Thomas Mann in 1929. It was published by Martin Secker in 1930 in an English translation by Helen Tracy Lowe-Porter, and her translation was included in Thomas Mann's Stories of Three Decades, published by Alfred A. Knopf in 1936.

Plot summary
The narrator describes a trip by his family to the fictional seaside town of Torre di Venere, Italy (a fictional town based on the touristic city of Forte dei Marmi).  It becomes unpleasant, partly because he finds the Italian people to be too nationalistic.  The family attends a performance by a magician and hypnotist named Cipolla, who uses his mental powers in a fascist way to control his audience.  Cipolla represents the mesmerizing power of authoritarian leaders in Europe at the time — he is autocratic, misuses power, and is able to subjugate the crowd, counterbalancing his inferiority complex by artificially boosting his self-confidence.  Cipolla's assassination by Mario, a native of Torre di Venere, is not a tragedy but a liberation for the audience.

Adaptations
The story/novel has been adapted several times for the operatic stage.
Stephen Oliver's adaptation was premiered in 1988 at the Battignano Festival. 1989 saw a one-act opera by the Hungarian composer János Vajda to a libretto by Gábor Bókkon. A recording was issued in 1990 on the Hungaroton label.
. A three-hour-long opera adaptation by composer Harry Somers with lyrics by Rod Anderson premiered 19 May 1992 at the Elgin Theatre, Toronto. Mario and the Magician was adapted into an English opera by librettist J. D. McClatchy and composer Francis Thorne.  It was first performed in 2005 by the Center for Contemporary Opera in the auditorium of Hunter College. A recording of this production was released on compact disc by Albany Records in 2006.  The original cast included Justin Vickers as Mario, Larry Small, Jessica Grigg, Wendy Brown, Beata Safari, Sankofa Sarah Wade, Jim Gaylord, Eric Jordan, Isai Jess Muñoz, Leandra Ramm, Richard Cassell, Jason Cammorata and Nathan Resika. There is also a 1994 film with Klaus Maria Brandauer as Cipolla and Julian Sands as the patriarch, directed by Brandauer. Briscula the Magician is an operatic adaptation by Bob Misbin with music by Frances Pollock. It was performed in Silver Spring Maryland in March 2020 by Bel Cantanti Opera. In this adaptation the magician prevails. This change reflects the history of the ascendance of fascism in Europe not yet evident when Mann published his story in 1929. 
As noted by Dr. Mark Dreisonstok in Maryland Theatre Guide, March 7 2020, this opera is an "accessible entry point" into the work of Thomas Mann.

External links
 Text, online (pdf)
 The Evil Magician Casts a Spell, by Colin Campbell in The New Republic, 15 Aug 2016, making analogy between the magician in the story and a U.S. presidential candidate

1929 German-language novels
Novellas by Thomas Mann
Novels set in Italy
Martin Secker books
German novels adapted into films
Novels adapted into operas